Alan Singley and Pants Machine is an Indie rock band from Portland, Oregon, made up of Alan Singley, Gus Elg, Leb Borgerson, and Scott Hayden. Alan Singley and Pants Machine is a fixture of the Portland, Oregon independent music scene. They've been featured twice on the PDX Pop Now! compilation, as among the Willamette Week's Best New Bands of 2006.

Alan Singley and Pants Machine are currently recording an orchestral record and playing the West Coast of the United States.

Members
Alan Singley - lead vocals
Gus Elg - bass, recording
Leb Borgerson - guitar, backup vocals
Scott Hayden - drums

Discography
Oh, Salad Days (2003)
Audiobicyclette (2005)
Lovingkindness (2006)
Feelin' Citrus (2009)

References

External links
Alan Singley and Pants Machine's Myspace Page

Musical groups from Portland, Oregon
2003 establishments in Oregon
Musical groups established in 2003